Falls is an unincorporated community in Grant County, West Virginia, United States. Its post office  is closed.

References

Unincorporated communities in Grant County, West Virginia
Unincorporated communities in West Virginia